Guayama Convention Center is a convention center in Guayama, Puerto Rico. It is one of the main performing arts and sports venues in Puerto Rico, especially in the south and southeast areas of the island. The center was built in 2000 and has a capacity of 2700.

References

External links 
 De paso por el Centro de Convenciones Curet Alonso 

2010 Central American and Caribbean Games venues
Convention centers in Puerto Rico
Guayama, Puerto Rico